Pinus monophylla, the single-leaf pinyon, (alternatively spelled piñon) is a pine in the pinyon pine group, native to North America. The range is in southernmost Idaho, western Utah, Arizona, southwest New Mexico, Nevada, eastern and southern California and northern Baja California.

It is widespread and often abundant in this region, forming extensive open woodlands, often mixed with junipers in the Pinyon-juniper woodland plant community. Single-leaf pinyon is the world's only one-needled pine.

Description

Species
The bark is irregularly furrowed and scaly. The cones thus grow over a two-year (26-month) cycle, so that newer green and older, seed-bearing or open brown cones are on the tree at the same time.

The seed cones open to  broad when mature, holding the seeds on the scales after opening. Empty pine nuts with undeveloped seeds (self-pollinated) are a light tan color, while the "good" ones are dark brown. The pine nuts are dispersed by the pinyon jay, which plucks the seeds out of the open cones, choosing only the dark ones and leaving the light ones (as in image at right). The jay, which uses the seeds as a food resource, stores many of the seeds for later use by burying them. Some of these stored seeds are not used and are able to grow into new trees. Indeed, Pinyon seeds will rarely germinate in the wild unless they are cached by jays or other animals.

Subspecies and genetics
There are three subspecies:
 Pinus monophylla subsp. monophylla. Most of the range, except for the areas below. Needles more stout, bright blue-green, with 2–7 resin canals and 8–16 stomatal lines.
 Pinus monophylla subsp. californiarum (D. K. Bailey) Zavarin. Southernmost Nevada, southwest through southeastern California (northwest only as far as the San Jacinto Mountains) to 29°N in northern Baja California. Needles less stout, gray-green, with 8–16 resin canals and 13–18 stomatal lines.
 Pinus monophylla subsp. fallax (E. L. Little) D.K. Bailey. Slopes of the lower Colorado River valley and adjacent tributaries from St. George, Utah to the Hualapai Mountains, and along the lower flank of the Mogollon Rim to Silver City, New Mexico. Needles less stout, gray-green, with 2–3 resin canals and 8–16 stomatal lines.

It is most closely related to the Colorado pinyon, which hybridises with it (both subsps. monophylla and fallax) occasionally where their ranges meet in western Arizona and Utah. It also (subsp. californiarum) hybridises extensively with Parry pinyon.  This classification of pinyon species based only upon the presence of single-needle fascicles is brought into doubt by the reporting of trees from both the Pinus monophylla/Pinus edulis and the Pinus monophylla subsp. fallax/Pinus edulis zones as growing more single needle fascicles after dry years and more two-needled fascicles after wet years.

Mojave National Preserve
An isolated population of single-leaf pinyon trees in the Mojave Desert's New York Mountains, within the Mojave National Preserve of southeast California, has needles mostly in pairs and was previously thought to be Colorado pinyons. They have recently been shown to be a two-needled variant of single-leaf pinyon from chemical and genetic evidence.

Occasional two-needled pinyons in northern Baja California are hybrids between single-leaf pinyon and Parry pinyon.

Prehistoric occurrence
Pinus monophylla has been studied with regard to prehistoric occurrence based upon fossil needles found in packrat middens and fossil pollen records. All three of these sub-types of single-needled pinyon have maintained distinctive ranges over the last 40,000 years, although the northerly species (Pinus monophylla) expanded greatly throughout Utah and Nevada since the end of the Pleistocene, 11,700 years ago. The southern California variety has been found to occur within Joshua Tree National Park throughout the last 47,000 years.

Uses and symbolism

The edible seeds, pine nuts, are collected throughout its range; Native American of the Great Basin region commonly ate them. Various birds and mammals eat the seeds as well. The roasted cones are also edible.

Individuals may harvest the seed for personal use on BLM and Forest Service land.

Single-leaf pinyon is also cultivated as an ornamental tree for native plant, drought tolerant, and wildlife gardens, and for natural landscaping. It is used regionally as a Christmas tree.  It is rarely seen in nurseries, because it is difficult to germinate.

In 1959, it was designated Nevada's state tree, later to be joined by the Great Basin Bristlecone Pine.  Its discovery, by White people, is attributed to American politician and explorer John C. Frémont.

Deforestation
During the mid-nineteenth century, many pinyon groves were cut down to make charcoal for ore-processing, threatening the traditional lifestyle of the Native Americans who depended on them for food.  When the railroads penetrated these areas, imported coal supplanted locally produced charcoal.

Following the resulting re-establishment of pinyon woodlands after the charcoal era, many cattle ranchers became concerned that these woodlands provided decreased livestock forage in grazing rangeland.  Efforts to clear these woodlands, often using a surplus battleship chain dragged between two bulldozers, peaked in the 1950s, but were subsequently abandoned when no long term forage increase resulted.  The habitat destruction of large areas of Pinyon woodlands in the interests of mining and cattle ranching is seen by some as an act of ecological and cultural vandalism.

See also
 Pinyon pines
 Pinyon-juniper woodland

References

Sources
 C. Michael Hogan (2009). Elephant Tree: Bursera microphylla, GlobalTwitcher.com, ed. N. Stromberg
 
 Ronald M. Lanner (1981). The Piñon Pine: A Natural and Cultural History. University of Nevada Press. .

Further reading

External links
 Photo of cones (scroll ¾-way down)
 Gymnosperm Database: Pinus monophylla
 USDA Plants Profile: Pinus monophylla

monophylla
Edible nuts and seeds
Trees of the Southwestern United States
Trees of the Northwestern United States
Trees of the South-Central United States
Trees of Baja California
Trees of the Great Basin
North American desert flora
Flora of the California desert regions
Flora of Baja California
Flora of Arizona
Flora of California
Flora of Nevada
Flora of Utah
Flora of Idaho
Flora of New Mexico
Flora of the Western United States
Flora of the Southwestern United States
Mojave National Preserve
Natural history of the Mojave Desert
Plants used in Native American cuisine
Taxa named by John Torrey
Taxa named by John C. Frémont
Least concern flora of the United States
Garden plants of North America
Ornamental trees
Drought-tolerant plants